Albert was a provincial electoral district for the Legislative Assembly of New Brunswick, Canada.  It was created in 1846 when Albert County was created and its boundaries were the same as the county.  It returned two members until 1973 when New Brunswick moved to single member districts, and this riding was split into the current riding of Albert and the new riding of Riverview.

Members of the Legislative Assembly

Election results

Notes

External links 
Website of the Legislative Assembly of New Brunswick

Former provincial electoral districts of New Brunswick
1974 disestablishments in New Brunswick
Constituencies disestablished in 1974